The MGP Nordic 2007 song competition for children was held in Oslo, Norway, on 24 November 2007. It was the third time a Nordic Melodi Grand Prix competition was held.

Participating countries were Norway, Sweden, Denmark and Finland. 2007 also marked the first time that Finland participated. The debuting country was represented by Yle Fem, the Swedish-speaking division of Yle. As a result, Finland's songs were sung in Swedish rather than Finnish.

Organization 

One song from each country will win a place in the 'super final', whereupon a winner will be announced. Winners were determined only by televoting. Each country has a total of 10,000 points to give to others, and these points are distributed according to the percentage each country gets votes.

National selections 
Norway decided: 2 June 2007
Denmark decided: 15 September 2007
Sweden decided: 5 October 2007
Finland decided: 2 November 2007

Final 
Each of the Scandinavian countries were represented by two artists. The artist with the most votes from each country proceeded to the Super Final. The participants in the second round of the competition were Norway's Celine Helgemo, Finland's Linn Nygård, Denmark's Mathis Augustine, and Sweden's Vendela Hollström.

Super-final
Each country sang their songs again for the Scandinavian public. The viewers then voted for the second time. Each song gained points depending on the percentage of votes they won from each country. Norway was the tight winner of the contest with 11,358, only 143 points more than second placed Sweden, and only 476 points more than third-place Denmark.

Voting

References 

 Yle
 SVT
 NRK
 DR

MGP Nordic
2007 in Norwegian music
2007 in Swedish music
2007 in Danish music
2007 in Finnish television
2007 in Swedish television
2007 song contests
2007 in Finnish music
2007 in Norwegian television